John "Jack" Boxley (31 May 1931 – March 2016) was an English footballer who played as an outside left. He made over 290 Football League appearances in the years after the Second World War.

Career
Jack Boxley played locally for Stourbridge F.C. Pat Beasley signed Boxley in October 1950 from Stourbridge Town for Bristol City for £2,000. Jack Boxley made his debut in the Third Division South at outside left for Bristol City in a 2–1 win v Newport County on 14 October 1950. He made 23 appearances scoring two goals in his first season with the "Robins" in 1950–51. After creating numerous goalscoring opportunities for City forwards John Atyeo and Arnold Rodgers, Jack Boxley and Jimmy Rogers left Ashton Gate together to join Coventry City in December 1956. Boxley helped Coventry City gain promotion in season 1958–59 from the newly formed Fourth Division as runners up on goal difference from York City.
Boxley returned to Bristol City from Coventry City in August 1960. Boxley had the distinction of scoring Bristol City's first ever goal in the League Cup in October 1960 v Aldershot. Jack Boxley later played Western League football for Chippenham Town and Welton Rovers before playing for his final club Bath City in the Southern League.

After retiring from football Jack Boxley remained close to Ashton Gate working as a car salesman at Winterstoke Garage, just around the corner from the ground, for 34 years before retirement in March 1995. He died in March 2016.

Honours
with Bristol City
Football League Third Division South winner: 1954–55
with Coventry City
Football League Fourth Division runner up: 1958–59

References

1931 births
2016 deaths
Footballers from Birmingham, West Midlands
English footballers
Association football wingers
English Football League players
Southern Football League players
Western Football League players
Stourbridge F.C. players
Bristol City F.C. players
Coventry City F.C. players
Chippenham Town F.C. players
Welton Rovers F.C. players
Bath City F.C. players